Attorney General Gibbs may refer to:

George Couper Gibbs (1879–1946), Attorney General of Florida
Ivan Gibbs (1927–2011), Attorney-General of Queensland
Vicary Gibbs (1751–1820), Attorney General for England and Wales